Quigly is a surname. Notable people with the surname include:

Isabel Quigly (1926–2018), English writer and translator
Kathleen Quigly (1888–1981), Irish glass artist and painter

See also
Quigley